Benjamin Allen Treadaway (born September 25, 1961) is an American Republican politician. He is a member of the Alabama House of Representatives from the 51st District, being first elected in 2006.

Treadaway served for 31 years with the Birmingham Police Department, finishing his career as the assistant chief as appointed by Mayor Randall Woodfin. Treadaway retired in September 2020.

References

1961 births
Living people
Politicians from Birmingham, Alabama
Republican Party members of the Alabama House of Representatives
21st-century American politicians